Lukas Spendlhofer (born 2 June 1993) is an Austrian professional footballer who plays as a defender for Maccabi Bnei Reineh.

Club career
Spendlhofer made his debut in the Serie A with Inter Milan on 12 May 2013 against Genoa, ended without goals.

On 9 May 2018, he played as Sturm Graz best Red Bull Salzburg in extra time to win the 2017–18 Austrian Cup.

On 2 October 2020, Spendlhofer returned to Italy and signed a two-year contract with Ascoli.

On 9 February 2021, he joined Israeli Premier League side Bnei Sakhnin on loan for the rest of the season.

In June 2022 Spendlhofer signed for Maccabi Bnei Reineh.

Honours
Sturm Graz
 Austrian Cup: 2017–18

References

External links 
 
 

Living people
1993 births
People from Neunkirchen District, Austria
Austrian footballers
Footballers from Lower Austria
Association football defenders
Austria under-21 international footballers
Austria youth international footballers
Serie A players
Serie B players
Austrian Football Bundesliga players
Israeli Premier League players
Inter Milan players
S.S.D. Varese Calcio players
SK Sturm Graz players
Ascoli Calcio 1898 F.C. players
Bnei Sakhnin F.C. players
Maccabi Bnei Reineh F.C. players
Austrian expatriate footballers
Austrian expatriate sportspeople in Italy
Expatriate footballers in Italy
Austrian expatriate sportspeople in Israel
Expatriate footballers in Israel